Nine Dragons is the 14th novel in the Harry Bosch series and the 22nd book (21st novel) by American crime author Michael Connelly. It was published in the U.K. and Ireland on October 1, 2009, and worldwide on October 13, 2009.

The novel is partly set in Hong Kong, where Bosch's daughter Maddie and ex-wife Eleanor Wish live. The main plot involves Maddie being kidnapped by a Chinese Triad (crime syndicate), which Bosch believes is due to his investigation of an L.A. murder, in which his primary suspect is a member of a triad that was shaking down the victim. As a result, Bosch heads to Hong Kong in an effort to rescue her. The name of the most populated region of Hong Kong, Kowloon, means "nine dragons" in English.

Plot
Harry Bosch is still back in homicide (no closer duty for him) and during a slow night he is asked to investigate a shooting in a "rougher" section of L.A. Harry and his partner (Detective Ignacio Ferras) grudgingly take the assignment that would normally be handled by a gang-related crimes unit, and learn that a Chinese-American convenience store owner was murdered behind his own counter. The case draws Harry's interest because he remembers the store and that the owner had been kind to him several years earlier. He assures the owner's son, Robert Li, that he will catch the culprit.

Harry starts to realize that this might not have been a routine robbery but a possible execution by a Triad hitman. With the help of Detective David Chu of the Asian Gangs Unit, Harry starts to zero in on a suspect and then receives a threatening call telling him to back off. Harry shrugs it off and continues but his investigation stalls when he receives a video showing his daughter (Maddie) being kidnapped in Hong Kong, which he believes to be related to the Triad and his murder investigation. He rushes off to save her, realizing that if he is not back within 48 hours, a suspect in the shooting will be set free.  Because of the length of the flights, Harry will have less than 24 hours in Hong Kong to find Maddie.

During a tense plane ride to Hong Kong, Harry feels powerless because there is nothing he can do in the air. When he gets to Hong Kong, he is aided by Maddie's mother, his ex-wife Eleanor Wish, and her Chinese boyfriend. Harry has limited clues but through very good forensic science, he is able to determine where to look for Maddie – however, during the search, Eleanor is killed by thieves. Despite that, Harry and her boyfriend continue to race to find Maddie because any delay could mean that she might already be dead or shipped into slavery by the Triad.  Harry rescues her from the Triad in the nick of time and takes her to L.A. After his departure, the Chinese government sends officers to L.A. to extradite Harry for his violations of Chinese law in his search for Maddie, but Harry's half-brother, lawyer Mickey Haller, forces the Chinese to drop this attempt.  However, Harry and Chu determine, through other forensic evidence, that there is no connection between Maddie's kidnapping and his murder investigation.  Instead, the murder evidence points to Robert Li, the son of the victim, and his best friend Eugene Lam.

Bosch and Chu arrest Lam, whom they believe to be the killer, while leaving Ferras to follow Robert Li. Lam reveals that the entire murder was a plot concocted by Mia Li, the victim's daughter, to relieve her of the burden of her parents; Robert had come up with the idea of disguising it as a Triad killing. When Bosch and Chu inform Ferras, he decides to single-handedly arrest Robert Li as an act of defiance against Bosch, but he is killed by Mia during the arrest. Mia then commits suicide. After Ferras' funeral, Maddie confesses to Harry that the "kidnapping" was originally a fake that she planned with "Quick", a Chinese friend, to get her mother to agree to let her live with Harry. However, when presented with the opportunity, Quick turned it into a real kidnapping, making the deal with the Triad from which Harry saved her. Maddie blames herself for the deaths that followed. Harry consoles her, promising to show her how they can make up for their mistakes.

Recurring characters in Nine Dragons
 Ignacio Ferras – Bosch's current partner
 Eleanor Wish – Former FBI agent and Bosch's ex-wife
 Madeline "Maddie" Bosch – Bosch's daughter
 Mickey Haller – Lawyer and Bosch's half-brother
 Carmen Hinojos – Psychologist for the Los Angeles Police Department
 Jack McEvoy and Judge Judith Champagne are referred to but do not appear

Other characters
 David Chu – LAPD Detective with the Asian Gangs Unit, formerly known as the Asian Crimes Unit
 Sun Yee – current lover of Eleanor Wish, employed as security by the casino, and Bosch's unexpected partner in Hong Kong
 John Li – Proprietor of Fortune Liquors
 Robert Li – John Li's son and manager of Fortune Fine Foods and Liquor
 Mia Li – John Li's daughter
 Bo-Jing Chang – Bagman for the triad group Yung Kim
 Larry Gandle – LAPD Lieutenant and Bosch's boss
 Peng "Quick" Qingcai – Older brother of a friend of Madeline
 Eugene Lam – Assistant manager of Fortune Fine Foods and Liquor

References

Harry Bosch series
2009 American novels
Novels set in Los Angeles
Novels set in Hong Kong
Little, Brown and Company books
Triad (organized crime)